Dokuchaievsk or Dokuchaevsk (Russian: Докучаевск) is a city of regional significance in Donetsk Oblast, Ukraine. The city is located on the river Sukha Volnovakha in Kalmiuske Raion, which it does not belong to. Its population is approximately

History 
Starting mid-April 2014 Russian-backed separatists captured Dokuchaievsk and several other towns in Donetsk Oblast. Since then the city has been under the control by the Donetsk People's Republic.

Demographics
As of the Ukrainian Census of 2001:

Ethnicity
 Ukrainians: 66.6%
 Russians: 28.2%
 Greeks: 2.1%
 Moldovans: 1.0%
 Belarusians: 0.5%

Language
Russian: 72.1%
Ukrainian: 27.3%

Gallery

References

Cities in Donetsk Oblast
Cities of regional significance in Ukraine
Populated places established in the Russian Empire
1912 establishments in the Russian Empire
Kalmiuske Raion